The École Nationale Des Sciences Appliquées de Khouribga(ENSA Khouribga) is a Moroccan public engineering school within the Sultan Moulay Souliman University of Beni Mellal. It was created in 2007 to support the government's commitment under the National Training Initiative of 10,000 engineers by 2010. It trains state engineers to be qualified scientifically, technically in modeling, and communication management. It is part of the National Schools of the Applied Sciences network.

Programmes
Computer engineering
Telecommunication and Networks engineering
Engineering Processes for Energy and the Environment
Electrical engineering

External links
  Site officiel de l'ENSA de Khouribga

Education in Morocco
Engineering universities and colleges